Prilep Knoll (‘Prilepska Mogila’ \'pri-lep-ska mo-'gi-la\) is the ice-covered hill rising to 713 m at the south entrance to Misty Pass, on the west side of Laclavère Plateau on Trinity Peninsula in Graham Land, Antarctica.  It is surmounting Broad Valley to the southeast.

The knoll is named after the settlement of Prilep in Southeastern Bulgaria.

Location

German-British mapping in 1996.

Maps
 Trinity Peninsula. Scale 1:250000 topographic map No. 5697. Institut für Angewandte Geodäsie and British Antarctic Survey, 1996.
 Antarctic Digital Database (ADD). Scale 1:250000 topographic map of Antarctica. Scientific Committee on Antarctic Research (SCAR). Since 1993, regularly updated.

Notes

References
 Prilep Knoll. SCAR Composite Antarctic Gazetteer
 Bulgarian Antarctic Gazetteer. Antarctic Place-names Commission. (details in Bulgarian, basic data in English)

External links
 Prilep Knoll. Copernix satellite image

Hills of Trinity Peninsula
Bulgaria and the Antarctic